Khalil "Saint Cassius" Walton is an American musician, recording artist and independent music publisher based in  New York City.

He gained notoriety as a musician for his contribution to the Grammy Award winning single "Just the Way You Are" for Bruno Mars debut album Doo-Wops & Hooligans.

In 2013, Cassius launched the Independent Publishing & Recordings company Vinyl Crown. The company signed producer Darius "Phonix" Barnes to the publishing imprint & holds such copyrights as Trey Songz "Fumble", Fabolous' "We Good" ft. Rich Homie Quan as well as J. Cole's top single off his 2014 Forest Hills Release "No Role Modelz". On July 28, 2017, Cassius released his first single under the Vinyl Crown imprint entitled Take A Knee. 

On March 2, 2018, Saint Cassius released an EP called, ANALOG, it is a contemporary ode to the classic hip-hop era and showcases his ever-evolving musicianship. He shows off his appreciation for women on smooth Ro James collaboration “Hey Beautiful Girl” and the jazz-infused “Analog Dreams” touches subjects including the value of trap music, net neutrality and features actor/artist Omari Hardwick. The project is led by the production of legendary hitmaker DJ Toomp and also features tracks from JF Clay as well.

In November of 2018, Cassius launched a creative agency called Nyáma as a Vinyl Crown venture with a business partner and graphic designer Patso Dimitiov allowing Vinyl Crown to have an all in-house creative agency.

References

5. Saint Cassius Nyama Launch

6. Nyama Creative Agency Instagram Page

7. Take A Knee

Musicians from Atlanta
Living people
Year of birth missing (living people)
Musicians from New York (state)